"The Hands That Built America" is a song by Irish rock band U2. It was released on the soundtrack to the film Gangs of New York, and was one of two new songs on the group's The Best of 1990–2000 compilation (the other being "Electrical Storm"). It was nominated for Best Original Song at the 75th Academy Awards, but lost to Eminem's "Lose Yourself".

Composition
"The Hands That Built America" is a song about the experience of nineteenth century Irish migrants to New York and their contribution to building America.  The song was considered for single release and was announced as such for a 2003 release. The songs "The Playboy Mansion" (2003 Version - originally from Pop) and "That's Life" (a cover song by Bono and released on the soundtrack for The Good Thief) were announced as B-sides. The release was canceled, however.

Soundtrack and inspiration
The soundtrack mix of the song features Andrea Corr, who played the tin whistle, and Sharon Corr who played the violin. The title of the song was inspired by Horslips title track to their album "The Man Who Built America" with the full blessing of Horslips singer and bass player Barry Devlin, who had also produced a number of U2 videos. In Gangs of New York  the song is played with a long and grand intro and plays over the final sequence and the closing credits.

Live performances

U2 have performed this song live in its entirety seven times, the first being at the premiere of Gangs of New York on 9 December 2002, and the last occurrence done solely by Bono and the Edge as an acoustic performance at the opening of the Clinton Presidential Library in Little Rock, Arkansas on 18 November 2004.

Although "The Hands That Built America" has not been played live since 2004, it was included at every concert on the Vertigo Tour (2005–2006) as a snippet during performances of "Bullet the Blue Sky". This took place in conjunction with snippets of "When Johnny Comes Marching Home" and sometimes "Please". It was later featured as a snippet again on the Innocence + Experience Tour before "Pride (In the Name of Love)". It was later replaced by "Zooropa" on the European leg of the tour.

Music videos

Two different music videos were created for "The Hands That Built America". The first uses a combination of black-and-white footage of the band playing the song, and scenes from Gangs of New York. This video uses the version of the song found on  The Best of 1990–2000 CD. The second video is composed solely of black-and-white footage of U2 playing the song, and it was filmed on 9 May 2002. This video uses an acoustic version of the song, and is the version found on The Best of 1990–2000 DVD.

Credits and personnel
U2
Bono – vocals
The Edge – guitar
Adam Clayton – bass guitar
Larry Mullen Jr. – drums, percussion

Technical
Production – William Orbit
Engineering – Carl Glanville
Mixing – William Orbit at The Leonard Hotel, London
Additional keyboards – William Orbit
Pro-Tools programming – Iain Roberton, Jake Davies and Rico Conning
String arrangement – The Edge
String conductor – Daragh O'Toole
Strings –  Katie O'Connor, Rosie Nic Athlaioch, Emer O'Grady, Una O'Kane
Recording –  HQ, Dublin and Nice, France

See also
U2 discography

References

External links
U2.com

U2 songs
2002 songs
Best Original Song Golden Globe winning songs
Songs written by Bono
Songs written by the Edge
Songs written by Adam Clayton
Songs written by Larry Mullen Jr.
Songs about New York City